Pseudohaloritoidea, formerly Pseudohaloritaceae, is one of four superfamilies of the goniatitid suborderTornoceratatina. Although attributed the Ruzhencev, 1957 (Ruzhencev named the Pseudohaloritidae, March 1957, eight months ahead of Miller and Furnish) T.J Frest et al. included the Maximitidae and Pseudohaloritidae in the Cheilocerataceae in their May 1981 paper.

References
 T.J Frest, B.F.Glenister,& W.M. Furnish, 1981. Pennsylvanian-Permian Ammonoid Families Maximitidae and Pseudohaloritiae. The Paleontological Society Memoir 11, May 1981
GONIAT 5/28/12
 The Paleobiology Database 5/28/12

 
Tornoceratina
Goniatitida superfamilies
Pennsylvanian first appearances
Lopingian extinctions